Xinping Yi and Dai Autonomous County is an autonomous county located in the central part of Yunnan Province, China. It is the westernmost county-level division of the prefecture-level city of Yuxi.

Administrative divisions
Xinping Yi and Dai Autonomous County has 2 subdistricts, 4 towns and 6 townships. 
2 subdistricts
 Guishan
 Gucheng
4 towns

6 townships

Ethnic groups
The Xinping County Gazetteer (1993:106, 118) lists the following Yi and Hani subgroups.

Yi: 111,555 (1987); subgroups are Niesu 聂苏, Nasu 纳苏, Chesu 车苏, Lalu 腊鲁, Lawu 拉乌, Mili 咪利, Micha 密查, Xiangtang 香堂, Luowu 罗武, Menghua 蒙化
Niesu 聂苏: Lukuishan 鲁魁山 and Mopanshan 磨盘山 of Yangwu Township 扬武镇
Nasu 纳苏: Xinhua 新化乡, Laochang 老厂乡, Feijia 费贾 of Pingdian 平甸乡, Taokong 桃孔, Baihe 白鹤, Zhedian 者甸
Chesu 车苏: Laochang 老厂乡
Hani: 9,547 (1987)
Kaduo 卡多: Wajiao 挖窖 of Jianxing 建兴乡; Wasi 瓦寺 and Baizhi 柏枝 of Pingzhang 平掌乡; Shengli 胜利 of Mosha 漠沙乡
Nuobi 糯比 and Suobi 梭比: Meiziqing 梅子箐 of Jianxing 建兴乡; Dazhai 大寨 of Fuxing 复兴
Woni 窝尼: Yani 亚尼 of Pingdian 平甸
Duota 堕塔: Xinzhai 新寨村 of Panlong 盘龙
Biyue 碧约: Mowei 磨味 of Jianxing 建兴乡

There are various Tai ethnic groups in Xinping County. They numbered 40,890 (15.54%) of the total population of Xinping County as of 2000, and include the following subgroups.

Tai Kha 傣卡 (Chinese Dai 汉傣): in Mosha Town 漠沙镇 and Yaojie Town 腰街镇
Tai Sa 傣沙 (Tai Xa): in Mosha Township 漠沙镇
Tai Ya 傣雅 (Tai Yalun 傣雅伦): in Gasa Town 嘎洒镇 and Shuitang Township 水塘镇

These three groups are known as the 花腰傣, or 'Flowery-waisted Tai' due to the style of their women's clothing. Local Tai languages include the Yuánxīn 元新 dialect of Tai Hongjin.

The Damuyu Flowery-Waist Dai Cultural and Ecological Tourist Village is located in Longhe Village 龙河村, Mosha Township 漠沙镇.

Climate

References

External links
Xinping County Official Website

 
County-level divisions of Yuxi
Yi autonomous counties
Dai autonomous counties